The Med are an ethnic community found in the coastal areas of Balochistan, Pakistan, mainly in the regions of Makran and Las Bela, and the Makran region of Sistan and Baluchestan Province of Iran.

Origin 
There are different theories as to the origin of the Med community. According to their own tribal traditions, the Med originate from Gandava in the Kacchi region of Balochistan. It is likely that the Med are one of the earliest settlers of the Makran coast or remnants of the historic Median people, and this is reinforced by the fact that the Med are mentioned in the chronicle of ancient Sindh, the Chachnama, as one of the tribes that inhabited coastal Balochistan. The Med speak Balochi which itself is one of the closest surviving relatives of the ancient Median language and the Med also consider themselves as Baloch. However, in both Makran and Las Bela, they are seen as a distinct tribe by both the Sindhi and Baloch. The Mohana tribe of Sindh and southern Punjab claim to be of Med origin.

Social organization 

In Lasbela District they are found mainly in the cities of Miani and Ormara, and villages in between these towns, while in Makran they are found in the cities of Gwadar and Sonmiani, and also in the villages in between. The Med are divided into four clans, the Chilmarzai, who claim descent from the Numrio tribe of Sindh, the Jalalzai and Gazbur, who claim Baloch ancestry and then finally the Olmari who claim Pashtun ancestry. This suggests that the Med community is of diverse origin, absorbing different groups which migrated to Makran. In recent times, the Med have absorbed groups of African ancestry such as the Siddi. Meds are Muslims and like many other Makran communities, they are also divided along sectarian lines. Many Gwadar Meds belong to the Zikri sect while the vast majority of Meds are Sunni Hanafis. Along coastal Balochistan, fishing is entirely in the hands of the Med, with an individual fishing boat owned by a particular lineage. The Med also form an important element within the Baloch population of Karachi.

In Iran, the Med settlements cling to the coastline of the Makran region of the province of Sistan and Baluchestan. They are largely engaged in fishing, but some of their settlements on the banks of the various seasonal streams also engage in agriculture. The Med have vague traditions which are said to be originated in Sindh, but now they consider themselves and are looked to by others as Baloch. Like other Iranian Baloch, the Med are Sunni, as distinct from the majority in Iran, who are Shia.

See also 

 Siddi
 Mohana (tribe)

References 

Baloch tribes
Social groups of Balochistan, Pakistan
Indigenous peoples of South Asia
Ethnic groups in Iran
History of Sindh